Gian Antonio Selva (2 September 1751 - 22 January 1819) was an Italian neoclassical architect.

Biography
He was born in Venice, the son of scientist Lorenzo Selva. He studied architecture in Venice, and was a pupil of the architect Tommaso Temanza and the painter Pietro Antonio Novelli. Selva visited Rome, where he met Antonio Canova and traveled with him to Naples. He also visited London, Paris, Belgium and the Netherlands (1778-1781).

His works include the renovation of Palazzo Dolfin Manin for doge Ludovico Manin, the Villa Manfrin detta Margherita a Sant'Artemio, near Treviso (c. 1790), the original Teatro La Fenice (designed in 1798 and destroyed by fire in 1996), renovation of Palazzo Smith Mangilli Valmarana (1784), the Teatro Nuovo of Trieste (1798), Teatro de La Sena of Feltre, cathedral of Cologna Veneta (1807–10) and the church of San Maurizio in Venice (1806).

He wrote a description of works in Venice, and translated works from Perrault and Chambers from French and English respectively.

He died suddenly in Venice in 1819.

References

1751 births
1819 deaths
18th-century Italian architects
19th-century Italian architects
Italian neoclassical architects
Republic of Venice architects